Studio 11 is a recording studio in Chicago, Illinois, founded in 1996. Best known for hip hop music, duranguense, gangsta rap, and house music styles, Studio 11 has recorded, mixed, and mastered over 35,000 musical songs.

History

Early History
Studio 11 was initially opened in a coach house building at 11 East Superior Street by Alex Gross and Dan Scalpone, while students of sound engineering at Columbia College. By 1999 the studio expanded to the top floor at 209 W. Lake St. into two music studios to accommodate larger volumes of recording. Early adaptation of digital technology established Studio 11 as a premiere Chicago destination for recording rap and electronic music, highlighted by the early works of Kanye West, Lupe Fiasco, Yung Berg, and Crucial Conflict, as well as more recent recordings with Rockie Fresh, Cashis, and French rapper Gradur.

Music
Founder Alex Gross established himself with the recording of Payroll 125, a rap album featuring the Kanye West produced song Never Change, subsequently sold to Jay Z and re-released on critically acclaimed album The Blueprint. In 2011, Studio 11 was selected as a curator for WFMU New York's Free Music Archive, and has since released nearly 200 contributions totalling over 100,000 downloads, featuring artists such as Greenskeepers, Glass Lux, Track Jackit, Angel Alanis and The Dread.

Notable clients

Selected recordings

Albums

Singles

12" Vinyl Singles / EPs

Films

References

External links
 Studio 11 website
 Free Music Archive

Recording studios in the United States
Companies based in Chicago
Music of Chicago